Ian Gibson may refer to:

Sports
Ian Gibson (cricketer) (1936–1963), English cricketer
Ian Gibson (footballer, born 1943) (1943–2016), Scottish football player (Bradford Park Avenue, Middlesbrough, Coventry, Cardiff)
Ian Gibson (footballer, born February 1956) (born 1956), Scottish football player (Aberdeen and Kilmarnock)
Ian Gibson (footballer, born July 1956) (born 1956), Scottish football player and manager (St. Johnstone)
Ian Gibson (Scottish footballer) (unknown), Scottish football player (Fitzroy United and South Melbourne)

Others
Ian Gibson (politician) (1938–2021), British academic scientist and Member of Parliament
Ian Gibson (author) (born 1939), historian
Ian Gibson (comics) (born 1946), British artist of comic books
Ian Gibson (businessman) (born 1947), former director of Northern Rock, chairman of Trinity Mirror 
Ian Gibson (professor) (born 1963), scientist and professor

See also
 Gibson (surname)